Alpha is a 2018 American prehistorical adventure film directed by Albert Hughes and written by Daniele Sebastian Wiedenhaupt, from a story by Hughes. The film stars Kodi Smit-McPhee as a young hunter who encounters and befriends an injured wolf during the last ice age, with Jóhannes Haukur Jóhannesson as his father. The wolf Alpha is played by Chuck, a Czechoslovakian Wolfdog.

Principal photography began in February 2016 in Canada and lasted through that April. The film was delayed several times, before being released in the United States on August 17, 2018, by Sony Pictures Releasing. It grossed over $99million worldwide and received generally favorable reviews from critics, who praised the performances and cinematography.

Plot
In Upper Paleolithic Europe 20,000 years ago, a small tribe of hunter-gatherers prepare for a hunting expedition to hunt for the coming winter's food. Tau, its chief, trains his teenage son Keda, accepting him and Keda's friend Kappa to join the hunting party. His wife Rho worries that Keda is not ready, but Tau believes he is and the hunters set out.

Tau tests Keda by having him kill a wild boar they've caught, but Keda hesitates. One night, the party's fire draws the attention of a large cave lion, which lunges through their circle, snatching Kappa before anyone can do anything. Hearing the fatal struggle in the darkness, the tribe gives him up for dead. Kappa is given a memorial service in the form of a cairn to symbolize the passing of one's spirit to the afterlife.

The hunters eventually reach a herd of steppe bison, which they attempt to stampede off a cliff with relative success. Amidst the chaos, the bull rushes towards Keda and tosses him over the edge, leaving him gripping the rough cliff edge with his hand. Keda loses his grip and plummets to a further ledge where he appears to break his leg and is knocked unconscious. Tau attempts to climb down to him, but he is stopped by fellow hunter Sigma who assures him in good faith that Keda is dead and there would be no way to reach him anyway. The tribe leaves and Tau performs another funeral ritual, stricken with grief.

Keda is awoken by a vulture who mistakes him for dead. He kills the bird by wringing its neck and tries to climb the rest of the way down the cliff. A sudden heavy rainfall causes the ravine below to flood. Losing his grip, Keda falls into the water. He survives and splints his injured foot before returning to the top of the cliff. Seeing the memorial cairn left by his tribe, he realizes he must travel back to the village by himself.

Keda is later attacked and chased by a pack of ferocious wolves, but escapes up a tree and wounds one of the pack members which the others leave behind. Keda takes pity on it and cares for its injury. Gradually gaining the wolf's trust, he gives it water and then food, establishing himself as dominant by feeding himself first. He sets out for the village without the wolf, but it follows him. Their relationship grows, and they learn to hunt animals together. Along the way, Keda names the wolf Alpha.

One night, they are approached menacingly by a pack of wolves. Upon seeing Alpha, who steps forward to greet them, they recognize Keda's companion. The pack run off and with Keda's blessing, Alpha joins them. Keda continues his journey alone as the season changes into winter. On a frozen lake, he encounters a pack of wolves feeding on a carcass. Recognizing Alpha, he runs to them, but the ice breaks and he falls through. Alpha helps rescue him and they are reunited.

Continuing the journey together, they find a man who has frozen to death outside his tent and scavenge a bow and arrow from it. Later, they take refuge from a pack of cave hyenas inside a cave. However, inside they are confronted and attacked by another cave lion, causing Alpha to violently fight the animal. Keda saves Alpha by using the bow to kill the lion with the arrow, although Alpha is badly wounded in the fight and now travels with difficulty. Meanwhile, an equally injured Keda begins to cough up blood. When Alpha finally cannot walk, Keda carries the wolf.

Keda eventually finds his village while nearly passing out from exhaustion, and he reunites with his shocked but relieved parents who are amazed and proud of him. As the village healer tends to both Keda and Alpha's wounds, Alpha delivers a litter of puppies much to Keda's surprise, as Alpha is revealed to be female. Alpha and her pups are formally welcomed into the tribe and grow up in the care of Alpha and Keda. The final image of the film shows the tribe and their domesticated wolves, hunting together.

Cast
 Kodi Smit-McPhee as Keda
 Jóhannes Haukur Jóhannesson as Tau
 Natassia Malthe as Rho
 Marcin Kowalczyk as Sigma
 Jens Hultén as Xi
 Leonor Varela as Shaman
 Mercedes de la Zerda as Nu 
 Spencer Bogaert as Kappa
 Chuck as Alpha
 Morgan Freeman as Narrator (in the cut of the film released in the United Kingdom and Ireland; as released in the U.S. Morgan Freeman has no role and there is no voice-over narration)

Production
The film was first announced in September 2015 as The Solutrean, with Albert Hughes as director, produced by Studio 8. The film uses the IMAX 3D format. Kodi Smit-McPhee was confirmed as its star in November 2015, and other casting was finalized the following February.

The film's dialogue is in constructed languages ('conlangs') created by Christine Schreyer, an anthropology professor at UBC Okanagan. The main language, which Schreyer calls Beama and is spoken in two dialects, was inspired by Proto-Nostratic, Proto-Eurasiatic, and Proto-Dené–Caucasian. Schreyer also created a Neanderthal language for one scene.

Filming took place in Drumheller, Burnaby, and Vancouver, where a large set was built in Boundary Road near East Kent Avenue. Filming in Vancouver took place from February to May 2016, and at Dinosaur Provincial Park near Patricia, Alberta in April 2016, and in Iceland.

The production was investigated after five Alberta bison were allegedly killed in the making of the film. Following an investigation, the American Humane Association denied its "No Animals Were Harmed" end-credit certification to the production. Two days before the film's release, PETA called for a boycott of the film.

Release
In June 2017, the film's title was changed from The Solutrean to Alpha. Solutrean was an Upper Palaeolithic flint tool making style in Western Europe. The film was originally set for a release date of September 15, 2017, but it was pushed back from its original release date of September 15, 2017 to March 2, 2018. In December 2017, it was again pushed back, this time from March 2, 2018, to September 14, 2018. In April 2018, the release date was moved up from September 14, 2018, to August 17, 2018.

Home video release
Alpha was released on DVD and Blu-ray on November 13, 2018. The home video release includes both the theatrical release of the film  as well as a shorter director's cut. The home video release also includes deleted scenes with optional commentary by Albert Hughes, a director's commentary, and featurettes.

Reception

Box office
Alpha grossed $35.9million in the United States and Canada, and $62.3million in other territories, for a total worldwide gross of $98.2million, against a production budget of $51million.

In the United States and Canada, Alpha was released alongside Mile 22, and was projected to gross $7–9million from 2,719 theaters in its opening weekend. It made $3.4million on its first day, including $525,000 from Thursday night previews at 2,303 theaters. It went on to debut to $10.3million, finishing fifth at the box office. In its second weekend the film dropped to seventh place, making $5.6million.

Critical response
The website's critical consensus reads, "Well-acted and beautifully filmed, Alpha offers a canine-assisted epic adventure that blends rousing action with an extra helping of canine charm." On Metacritic, which assigns a normalized rating to reviews, the film has a weighted average score of 63 out of 100, based on 26 critics, indicating "generally favorable reviews". Audiences polled by CinemaScore gave the film an average grade of "B+" on an A+ to F scale.

See also
 List of adventure films of the 2010s

References

External links
 
 
 

2018 films
2010s historical adventure films
American epic films
American historical adventure films
Columbia Pictures films
Fictional-language films
Films scored by Michael Stearns
Films about animals
Films about hunter-gatherers
Films set in prehistory
Films set in Europe
Films shot in Alberta
Films shot in Iceland
Films shot in Vancouver
IMAX films
Prehistoric people in popular culture
2010s survival films
Films about wolves
American survival films
2010s American films